The 5R05, also called RE5R05A (Nissan part), JR507E/JR509E (Jatco part) or TG5C/TG5D "5EAT" (Subaru part), is a Jatco 5-speed automatic transmission, released in 2002, used in rear wheel drive or 4X4 vehicles with longitudinal engines. It shares little to nothing in common with the older 5R01 transmission.

Specifications

ATF
Its OEM ATF is the Original NISSAN ATF Matic J, for worldwide applications. Only for USA, this was superseded by Matic S in 2009.

For Subaru applications the fluid must conform to ATF-HP specifications. This is available from the dealer as relabeled Idemitsu fluid. Valvoline produces a blue bottled "Import Multi Vehicle" fluid that is applicable to all of North America while the red bottled "Max life ATF" is not applicable to vehicles operated in California. Castrol Transmax J and Pennzoil ATF-J are also approved fluids.

Gear ratios

Applications
 Kia Sorento 2003-2009
 Kia Borrego 2010-2012
 Infiniti_FX35 2003–2009
 2003–2008 VQ35DE
 Infiniti_G35 2003–2009
 2003–2006 VQ35DE
 2007–2009 VQ35HR
 Infiniti_G37
 2008 VQ37VHR
 Infiniti_M45 2003–2004
 2003–2004 
 Infiniti_Q45 2002-2006
 2002-2006
VK45DE
 Nissan 350Z 2003–2008.
 2003–2006 VQ35DE (Type A).
 2007–2008 VQ35HR (Type B).
 Nissan Armada (1st generation) 
 2004–2016 VK56DE (Type A).
 Nissan Navara (D40) 2005–2009.
QR25DE, VQ40DE (Type B).
YD25DDTi (Type A).
 Nissan Pathfinder (R51) 2005–2012.
VQ40DE (Type B).
VK56DE, YD25DDTi (Type A).
 Nissan Patrol (Y61) 2002–2010.
TB48DE (Type C).
 Nissan Stagea (M35) 2002-2007.
 VQ25DET
 Nissan Titan (A60) 2003–2015. VK56DE (Type A).
 Nissan Xterra (N50) 2005–2015. VQ40DE (Type B).

References 

5R05